Mylothris jacksoni, the Jackson's dotted border, is a butterfly in the family Pieridae. It is found in Nigeria, Equatorial Guinea (Bioko). Cameroon, Sudan, Ethiopia, the Democratic Republic of the Congo, Uganda, Rwanda, Burundi, Kenya and Tanzania. The habitat consists of submontane forests.

Adults have a weak flight and stay close to the ground. Males remain on wing for long periods, coursing along the edges of forests, while females spend most of their time in the forest canopy.

The larvae feed on Loranthus species.

Subspecies
M. j. jacksoni (Democratic Republic of the Congo, Uganda, Rwanda, Burundi, western and central Kenya, northern Tanzania)
M. j. cederici Collins, 1997 (Bioko)
M. j. cephisus Talbot, 1946 (south-eastern Kenya)
M. j. knutssoni Aurivillius, 1891 (eastern highlands of Nigeria, highlands of Cameroon)
M. j. nagichota Talbot, 1944 (mountains of southern Sudan, Ethiopia)
M. j. sagitta Clifton, 1980 (Kenya)

References

Seitz, A. Die Gross-Schmetterlinge der Erde 13: Die Afrikanischen Tagfalter. Plate XIII 11

Butterflies described in 1891
Pierini
Butterflies of Africa